Melancholie der Engel (English: The Angels' Melancholia) is a 2009 German independent exploitation horror film directed, shot and edited by Marian Dora and co-written by Dora and Carsten Frank (under the pseudonym Frank Oliver, used due to artistic disagreements). It received largely negative reviews, with some praise towards the cinematography, but most condemned it as hardcore exploitation with repetitive and meaningless depravity communicating its nihilistic message.

Plot
A woman named Katja gives birth to an infant that two mysterious figures immediately behead. Depressed and feeling his mortality, Katze decides to meet his old friend Brauth, who has a Christ-like appearance, at an old house where they used to delve into dark pleasures. They meet two sixteen-year-old girls, Melanie and Bianca. Together, they enter a bar where a woman, Anja, joins the group. Katze also finds two other old acquaintances attending: Heinrich, an elderly artist who claims to be a dead man, accompanied by a young woman named Clarissa, tied to a wheelchair. Clarissa can only excrete through a urine bag or artificial bowel outlet.

The group decides Katze can go out in style as their fun turns increasingly depraved and horrific. The film contains explicit representations of coprophilic and urophilic actions: one scene involves a man defecating on a woman while taking her panties off, wiping himself, and shoving the pair in her mouth, all the while gesturing harshly to put her finger in his dirty anus.

The protagonists begin to consume alcohol, opium and cocaine and think about different philosophical approaches during the same evening. Katze, Brauth and Anja reveal their nihilistic nature to the two girls, claiming they do not believe in heaven and will not be missed after dying. Then Katze, using a scalpel, deals cuts on Anja's breast as she vomits semen while cutting herself under the enthusiastic look of Brauth and the perplexed facial expressions of Melanie and Bianca.

The following morning, the group travels to a pond near a factory, where Brauth reveals that Katze does not have much time to live. During this, Melanie and Katze move away from the others. He meets a nun (Martina Adora) near a farm who leads him to a neighboring church. The nun begins to pray and then undresses and masturbates while Katze enters the crypts, watching the tombs with morbid curiosity; at the same time, Melanie assists in hunting and slaughtering a pig, and Brauth rapes Anja. Several newts, frogs, rats, cats and snails also get killed.

That night, Katze has an illness whose cause is attributed to Heinrich's indifference to God towards him. Brauth becomes tired of Clarissa's laments, slams her into a basement, and tortures her by ripping her colostomy device off, jabbing his fingers into the hole, then throwing her down from her wheelchair and abandoning her. During the night, Bianca awakens and claims that she "heard the voice of the dead." Katze checks and finds nothing but a rabbit hanged by Heinrich, beheaded and thrown by Katze.

Brauth connects with Melanie and Bianca the next day and locks them in a stable before sending Heinrich to abuse them. However, the two girls succeed in escaping- Heinrich later abuses Clarissa, who commits suicide the next morning, throwing herself off a cliff. At the same time, Anja finds the remains of the pig discarded by the butchers and is sexually excited by touching them while having a goat lick between her legs.

Young Bianca, derisively called Snow White, is also murdered by the group. After her womb has been removed with a knife, her skull is thrown. Katze and Brauth murder Heinrich by eviscerating him. Afterward, an orgy takes place in which the four remaining members of the group burn Heinrich, still alive, at a pyre while the participants engage in sexual acts and urinate into the fire.

Anja finds Katze in a confused state, bruised and pained. Bianca comes crawling from the old house while Melanie looks at a tiny skull inside a pendulum clock and finds a tape containing the scene shown at the beginning. The figures who killed the infant are Katze and Brauth, and the skull found in the clock is the infant's. Melanie crushes the cassette and uses the tape to masturbate while Bianca is reached and beaten by Anja, Heinrich, Katze, and Brauth. The latter then knocks her with a knife and abandons her. From the flames, a flash hits Katze's face, permanently blinding him. There are only a few hours left for him to live, and the following afternoon, Anja accompanies him to his tomb, where he speaks. Anja honors Katze by ornamenting his grave before reuniting with the nun and walking away silently.

Cast

Zenza Raggi as Brauth
Carsten Frank as Katze
Janette Weller as Melanie
Bianca Schneider as Bianca
Patrizia Johann as Anja S.
Peter Martell as Heinrich
Margarethe von Stern as Clarissa
Martina Adora as Nun
Marc Anton as Monk
Tobias Sickert as Tall Man
Ulli Lommel as Katze as Angel (voice)
Jens Geutebrück as Priest

Production
It was planned since 2003 though shooting was delayed due to monetary issues.

Release
The Angel's Melancholy premiered at Weekend of Fear Festival in Erlangen and Nuremberg, Middle Franconia, Franconia, Bavaria, Germany, on 1 May 2009. It was also screened at the New York International Independent Film and Video Festival in New York City on 27 October 2009, where it won Best International Feature Film – Arthouse Genre. It was later screened at BUT (B-Movies, Underground, and Trash) Film Festival in the Netherlands on 7 June 2013. The DVD was released on 30 July 2010 in Austria.

An extended version, running 165 minutes, was released in 2015.

Critical reception

Sean Leonard of HorrorNews.net stated that, even though it was beautifully shot, its "pretentious dialogue", and focus on shock rather than story got in the way of any real enjoyment. Severed Cinemas Ray Casta panned the film, highlighting the pacing and runtime, calling it "a depraved, perverse and nihilistic endurance test."

Collider selected the film for their list of "The Most Disturbing Movies of All Time". Taste of Cinema placed the film at No. 22 in its list of "The 25 Most Disturbing Horror Movies of All Time", stating: "Often described as having beautiful cinematography and being an art house style movie, it suffers from a bloated running time of 165 minutes and a very weak narrative." Some reviewers commended the aspects that others hated, specifically the runtime and storytelling.

Accolades
Melancholie der Engel won the Best International Feature Film – Arthouse Genre Award at New York International Independent Film and Video Festival in 2009.

References

External links

2000s avant-garde and experimental films
2009 independent films
2000s psychological drama films
2000s serial killer films
2009 films
BDSM in films
Films directed by Marian Dora
Films set in Croatia
Films set in Munich
Films shot in Poland
German avant-garde and experimental films
German independent films
2000s German-language films
German psychological films
Necrophilia in film
Outsider art
Films about rape
Self-reflexive films
Torture in films
German splatter films
Animal cruelty incidents in film
Works about melancholia
Works about nihilism
Works published under a pseudonym
2009 drama films
2000s German films